The Kingsland Commercial Historic District is a  historic district in Kingsland, Georgia which was listed on the National Register of Historic Places in 1994.  It included six contributing buildings.

The buildings are one- and two-story, brick and stuccoed commercial buildings built during 1912 to 1943.  They include:
the former State Bank building (1912) on South Railroad Avenue, a two-story brick building
the Camden Hotel (1929) building on South Lee Street, a two-story brick building, built by contractor M.M. Jarvis
the newspaper building (1925), South Lee Street, with Art Deco-influenced elements.

References

External links
 

Historic districts on the National Register of Historic Places in Georgia (U.S. state)
Art Deco architecture in Georgia (U.S. state)
National Register of Historic Places in Camden County, Georgia